Ali Roz (Arabic علي الرز) is the Managing Editor of Kuwait's daily newspaper Al Rai. Born in Lebanon, he is a syndicated columnist and a frequent commentator on Arabic satellite TVs.

Columns (Arabic) 

- Stand Up for the Sake of Forests 

- The Awaited One 

- The Book of His Life, Oh Boy! 

Year of birth missing (living people)
Living people
Lebanese journalists
Al Rai (Kuwaiti newspaper) people